Monochaetum floribundum is a sprawling shrub native to Central America. It is commonly found in cloud forests. It is sometimes grown in gardens for its profuse, small pink flowers.

Melastomataceae